Lianna Olivia Rebolledo is an anti-abortion activist who travels throughout latin America visiting shelters to counsel teen girls who are victims of rape and incest. At age 12, she was kidnapped and raped; after refusing an abortion she later gave birth to a daughter. She now works with N.G.O.’s and the U.N. pressuring politicians to have laws banning abortion of pregnancies conceived in rape in Latin America. She founded a non-profit organization “Loving Life” that promotes life and supports victims of abuse.

Early life
Rebolledo was living in Mexico City and after she was kidnapped by two men from a shopping mall, being raped and suffering violent injuries to her face and permanent eye damage, she was found to have been impregnated by one of her attackers. The doctors offered her the option to abort the fetus but she declined, saying "why should I punish the baby?" Her attackers were never punished and she did not want to give in to fearing her rapists. “why should we give (the baby) the death penalty when we are trying to rescind it for criminals?" Giving birth at 12 she later moved to Los Angeles where she became emancipated at 16, living with her daughter in an apartment. She worked as a cashier while attending UCLA where she studied communications, graduating with a journalism degree. After college she got a job in broadcasting, later completing a certification program in Counseling at LA City College.

Activism
She has travelled throughout Latin America, visiting shelters in Argentina, Chile, Ecuador, Mexico, Paraguay, Peru and in the U.S., giving talks to teen survivors of Rape, sowing seeds of hope that they too can persevere and extolling positive life consequences due to having a child of rape. She has also spoken to members of congress in those countries and their national assemblies, pushing to liberalize abortion laws for victims of rape.

She is currently a writer, producer and radio and television host with positive content broadcasts in English and Spanish.

Awards
Her awards include the Antonio de Carlo Academy of Arts award extended by the Universidad del Valle de Atemajac in the State of Querétaro, Mexico. She’s also recipient of an acknowledgment from the Civil Society of Zacatecas, Mexico, for volunteering for several years for the Prevention and Rescue Organization, California, USA; a certificate in "Family Forgiveness and Reconciliation" from LECI USA; an acknowledgment from Anahuac University Cancun, Mexico for outstanding work in youth training; and a certificate of thanks for participating work with the IUVE Youth in Leaders in Action organization, Nuevo Laredo, Tamaulipas, Mexico. Recently she was named 'Mujer Simbolo' by a Mexican periodical that rewards work and perseverance in defense of women.

See also
 Anti-abortion feminism

References

1980 births
Living people
People from Mexico City
Sexual abuse victim advocates
University of California, Los Angeles alumni
Anti-abortion movement
Feminism and health